S. Higgins Farm, also known as Shady View Farm, is a historic home located near Odessa, New Castle County, Delaware.  It was built about 1865, and is a two-story frame house built in the vernacular Victorian style. It sits on a stuccoed brick foundation and has a hipped roof.  It has an irregular, four-bay facade features a -story tower set off-center to the west with a pyramidal roof.

It was listed on the National Register of Historic Places in 1985.

References

Houses on the National Register of Historic Places in Delaware
Houses completed in 1865
Houses in New Castle County, Delaware
National Register of Historic Places in New Castle County, Delaware